Buchanania onchidioides is a rare species of sea snail, a marine gastropod mollusk in the family Fissurellidae, the keyhole limpets and slit limpets.

Description
The shell has an elongate-ovate shape, with a large central tubercle and radiating striae on a smooth mantle. The shell grows to a size of 80 mm. The oral appendages are simple, subulate and retractile.

Distribution
This marine species occurs off Argentina and Chile.

References

External links
 To Encyclopedia of Life
 To World Register of Marine Species

Fissurellidae
Gastropods described in 1830
Taxa named by René Lesson